Igloo was a New Zealand prepaid pay TV service launched on 3 December 2012. The Pace-supplied receiver provides customers access to free-to-air channels through Freeview, and previously a small selection of pay TV channels could be purchased for 30 days. On 1 March 2017, Igloo closed and the receiver was updated to allow viewers to use New Zealand's Freeview television service.

History
Igloo was founded by Sky Network Television and TVNZ in December 2011. Details were announced on December 8 via a press release. Sky held a 51% share in the venture while TVNZ, the minority shareholder has 49%.  TVNZ later sold their shares back to Sky in 2013 before completely exiting the venture in 2014.

Igloo was originally scheduled to start during the first half of 2012, however, they encountered delays and had to push the launch date back to December 2012. The service offered free-to-air HD (via terrestrial), along with pay TV channels provided by Sky, to a set top box being developed by Sky. It used digital terrestrial frequencies owned by Sky previously used for their analogue terrestrial offering (which is no longer offered). Sky was required to make use of the spectrum or it would be taken by the Government.

In July 2016 Sky announced that Igloo will end its transmissions from March 2017. Customers will no longer be able to purchase Igloo Channel Packs, watch Front Row events or Igloo On Demand. Igloo boxes will still be able to receive Freeview channels but without any technical support or the EPG.

Service
The service was targeted at individuals who may not be able to commit to a contract or do not need all of the channels available from the regular Sky pay TV offering.

Viewers could order live sport events via pay-per-view on the Front Row channel, as well as stream TV shows and movies using a broadband connection. The device provided by Igloo has the ability to "live pause" when a USB flash drive is inserted (as there is no hard disk drive built into the device). An 8GB flash drive will allow for around 60 minutes of live pause.

Pay-channel broadcasting was DVB-T2 256-QAM transport via UHF channel 30 (546 MHz) or 31 (554 MHz). This was separate from the DVB-T 64-QAM transports used by Freeview.

Channels
Sky and TVNZ defined a virtual channel ordered that groups channels by importance to the service operator as follows.

General entertainment channels were below 20 which included TVNZ's free-to-air TV One (selected HD), free-to-air TV2 (selected HD), TVNZ Heartland and TVNZ Kidzone24, MediaWorks' free-to-air TV3 (selected HD) and free-to-air Four, free-to-air Prime, Front Row (pay-per-view sports),  News Corporation's National Geographic, Viacom Media Networks channels MTV Hits and Comedy Central, Vibe, BBC Worldwide's BBC UKTV, BBC Knowledge and BBC World News, Food Television and Discovery Communications' Animal Planet.

All other national Freeview channels spilled over from 20 to 29 and 35 and from 50 to 59 which included timeshifted hour delay channels for TV One, TV2, TV3 and Four, government funded Maori TV and Parliament TV, Trackside, ChoiceTV, The Shopping Channel, World TV's Chinese channels CTV8 and TV9 and the Christian channels Firstlight and Hope Channel.

Kordia locally inserted channels were from 30 to 34 which for the Waikato and Bay of Plenty is tvCentral, for Rotorua are TV Rotorua and Info-Rotorua, for Auckland is TV33 and for Whangarei is Channel North.

Freeview audio only radio channels were from 36 to 39 which includes BaseFM.

Former digital H.222 transport (now closed)

See also
 Subscription television in New Zealand
 List of free-to-air channels in New Zealand

References

External links
Official site.

Television networks in New Zealand
New Zealand subscription television services
Companies based in Auckland
2017 disestablishments in New Zealand
New Zealand companies established in 2012